Don't Forget the Driver is a 2019 BBC Two comedy series, co-created and co-written by Tim Crouch and Toby Jones, in which Jones also stars alongside Erin Kellyman. A second series was commissioned by the BBC for broadcast in 2020, but was delayed and then cancelled due to the coronavirus pandemic. The show is produced by Sister Pictures and distributed by BBC Studios.

Plot
Set in Bognor Regis, Jones plays Pete Green, a depressed single father who works as a coach driver and discovers an asylum seeker after taking a coach party across the channel.

Cast
 Toby Jones as Pete Green
 Erin Kellyman as Kayla Green
 Luwam Teklizgi as Rita
 Danny Kirrane as Squeaky Dave
 Jo Eaton-Kent as Bradley
 Dino Kelly as Lech
 Marcia Warren as Joy
 Claire Rushbrook as Fran
 Jo Hartley as Mel
 Bharti Patel as Manju

Episodes

Production
For the role, Jones took Coach Driver Certificate of Professional Competence (CPC) lessons and failed his test twice, once for driving too fast and once for going too slowly. In January 2020, Don't Forget the Driver was renewed for a second series of six episodes. However this was cancelled by the BBC due to the Covid-19 pandemic a decision Jones described as “heartbreaking”.

Broadcast
The six-part series began airing in the UK on BBC Two at 10pm on 9 April 2019 and continued weekly. The series performed well in the 10pm slot attracting over 2.2 millions viewers. The series was made available in its entirety on iPlayer on 9 April.

Reception
The show won the 2019 Venice TV Award for Best Comedy.

Notes

References

External links
 
 
 

2019 British television series debuts
2019 British television series endings
2010s British comedy television series
English-language television shows
Television productions cancelled due to the COVID-19 pandemic